Simone Singh (born 10 November 1974) is an Indian actress and model.

Biography
Singh was born in Jamshedpur on 10 November 1974.

She made her acting debut with the television series Sea Hawks followed by a small role in Swabhimaan, in 1995. She played the title role in another popular television series Heena, which gave her wide recognition and was the highest rated show on Indian television at the time. She has been also praised for the role of Sakshi Goenka, a cunning and powerful woman, in Ek Hasina Thi.

She played roles in a few other movies and has been acclaimed for her role in Being Cyrus, co-starring Boman Irani, Dimple Kapadia and Saif Ali Khan. She also played a small role in the blockbuster movie "Kal Ho Na Ho".
She is the first Indian TV actress to present at the International Emmy Awards in NYC.  And she served on the jury of the first International Emmy Awards held in India in 2005.

Filmography

Film

Television

Awards

See also
 List of Indian television actresses

References

External links 
 

Indian film actresses
Indian television actresses
Actresses from Jharkhand
Living people
1974 births
People from Jamshedpur